Shine (an abbreviation of Still Here Ignoring Negative Energy) is the fifth studio album by American rapper Wale. It was released on April 28, 2017, by his label, Every Blue Moon, distributed by Maybach Music Group and Atlantic Records. The production on the album was handled by multiple producers including Cool & Dre, Kane Beatz, Diplo, Lee Major, Nez & Rio and Christian Rich among others. The album also features guest appearances by Dua Lipa, Chris Brown, Travis Scott, Lil Wayne, Wizkid, J Balvin and G-Eazy among others.

Shine was supported by four singles: "My PYT", "Running Back", "Fashion Week" and "Fish N Grits". The album received generally mixed reviews from music critics and achieved small commercial success. It debuted at number 16 on the US Billboard 200 chart, earning 28,000 album equivalent units in its first week.

This album mark as Wale's third and final release under the Atlantic Records label.

Singles
The first single from the album, "My PYT", was released on May 20, 2016. The music video for the track premiered on July 25, 2016. The song has peaked at number 54 on the US Billboard Hot 100 chart.

"Running Back" featuring American rapper Lil Wayne, was released as the second single on January 20, 2017. The song's music video premiered on February 6, 2017. It has peaked at number 100 on the Billboard Hot 100.

The third single from the album, "Fashion Week" featuring American rapper G-Eazy, was released on February 24, 2017. The music video for the track premiered on April 10, 2017.

The album's fourth single, "Fish N Grits", was released on April 6, 2017, and features American rapper Travis Scott.

Critical reception

Shine was met with generally mixed reviews from music critics. At Metacritic, which assigns a normalized rating out of 100 to reviews from professional publications, the album received an average score of 65, based on five reviews.

Commercial performance
Shine debuted at number 16 on the US Billboard 200 chart, earning 28,000 album equivalent units in its first week.

Track listing

Notes
  signifies a co-producer
  signifies an additional producer
 "Thank God" features additional vocals from singer Rotimi
 "Scarface Rozay Gotti" features background vocals from August Grant, and additional vocals from K-Doe Sleeze
 "My Love" features background vocals from Eric Bellinger
 "Fashion Week" features background vocals from August Grant, DJ Money, Edgar Machuca, Michika Skyy and Phil Adé
 "Colombia Heights (Te Llamo)" features additional vocals from Edgar Machuca
 "CC White" and "Heaven on Earth" features background vocals from Phil Adé
 "Fine Girl" features additional vocals from DJ Money
 "My PYT" features vocals from Sam Sneak

Sample credits
 "Thank God" contains a sample of "Wind Parade", written by Larry Mizell, as performed by Donald Byrd.
 "Fashion Week" contains a sample of "Kharma Is Coming", written by Kenna Zemedkun and Chad Hugo, as performed by Kenna.
 "CC White" contains a sample of "'Til the Cops Come Knockin'", written by Menard Maxwell and Hod David, as performed by Maxwell.
 "Fine Girl" contains a sample of "Can You Stand the Rain", written by James Harris and Terry Lewis, as performed by New Edition.
 "Heaven on Earth" contains a sample of "Lullabies", written by Yunalis Zara'ai and Christopher Braide, as performed by Yuna.
 "My PYT" contains an interpolation of "P.Y.T. (Pretty Young Thing)", written by James Ingram and Quincy Jones, as performed by Michael Jackson and a sample of "Sexual Healing", written by Marvin Gaye, Odell Brown and David Ritz, as performed by Marvin Gaye.
 "Smile" contains a sample of "I Wanna Be Where You Are", written by Arthur Ross and Leon Ware, as performed by Michael Jackson.

Personnel

Vocalists
 Wale – primary artist
 Lil Wayne – featured artist 
 Major Lazer – featured artist 
 Wizkid – featured artist 
 Dua Lipa – featured artist 
 G-Eazy – featured artist 
 J Balvin – featured artist 
 Travis Scott – featured artist 
 Davido – featured artist 
 Olamide – featured artist 
 Chris Brown – featured artist 
 Phil Adé – featured artist , background artist 
 Zyla Moon – featured artist 
 Rotimi – background artist 
 August Grant – background artist 
 K-Doe Sleeze – background artist 
 Eric Bellinger – background artist 
 DJ Money – background artist 
 Edgar Machuca – background artist 
 Michika Skyy – background artist 
 Sam Sneak – background artist 

Musicians
 Jeff Gitty – bass , guitar 
 Crissy J – violin 
 Cleva Keys – keyboard 
 Daniel Groover – guitar 

Technical
 Kevin Spencer – mixing engineer , recording engineer 
 David Kutch – mastering engineer 
 Blake Harden – mixing engineer 
 Chris Athens – mastering engineer 
 Chad "KM" Kitchens – mixing engineer , recording engineer 

Production
 Cool & Dre – producer 
 808-Ray – producer 
 Spinz Beats, Inc. – producer 
 Go Grizzly – producer 
 Dreamlife – producer 
 Diplo – producer 
 The Picard Brothers – producer 
 Kuk Harrell – additional producer 
 Simone Torres – additional producer 
 Christian Rich – producer 
 Don Cannon – producer 
 CED – producer 
 Big Ghost Ltd. – co-producer 
 DJ Money – additional producer 
 Kane Beatz – producer 
 Vinay – producer 
 Majestic Drama – producer 
 Nez & Rio – producer 
 Marcè Reazon – producer 
 Super Miles – producer 
 The Dope Boyz – producer 
 Lee Major – producer 
 Sean Momberger – producer 
 Pro Reese – producer

Charts

References

2017 albums
Albums produced by Christian Rich
Albums produced by Cool & Dre
Albums produced by Diplo
Albums produced by Don Cannon
Albums produced by Kane Beatz
Albums produced by Kuk Harrell
Albums produced by Lee Major
Maybach Music Group albums
Atlantic Records albums
Wale (rapper) albums